Hello, Goodbye, and Everything in Between is a 2022 American romantic drama film directed by Michael Lewen, in his directorial debut, from a screenplay by Amy Reed and Ben York Jones, based on the novel of the same name by Jennifer E. Smith. It stars Jordan Fisher, Talia Ryder, Ayo Edebiri, and Nico Hiraga. The film was released on July 6, 2022, by Netflix.

Plot
Clare, a high school senior recently moved back to a west coast town, is convinced by her old friend Stella to attend a Halloween party. Meeting Aiden, after a brief conversation, he takes over the stage singing karaoke. Having immediate chemistry, Clare and Aiden leave the party together and have a spontaneous date. Moving from state-to-state after her parents' divorce, she has never made many friends. Therefore Clare has chosen to focus on her studies to become a lawyer to help people. Aiden is the opposite, his parents are stable and still married, both doctors. Although he wants to be a professional musician, they would rather he became a doctor.

They go from stealing candies from a local shop to enjoying the playground on the walk back. Feeling the spark, Aiden leans in to kiss her, but Clare declares she does not want a boyfriend (as her parents were high school sweethearts who married but soon divorced). Aiden proposes a breakup pact: if they are still together through the end of next summer, they break up after an epic last date. This plan appeals to Clare, they kiss and begin a high school romance.

At summer's end, the day before Clare's road trip to Dartmouth, at a barbecue with both families, they are told they are naïve to give up on love. Nonetheless, Aiden has planned their last date, a total surprise. He hopes the perfect night will make her choose to stay together. The first stop is a musical performance by Aiden's old band. And on their first date he had performed for her, they dance to the song, cherishing the memory.

Next, Aiden takes Clare to the ice hockey rink to correct a wrong. They had their first fight there, over his need to be perfect. He confesses he lied then, and they play hockey together. The third stop is on a speedboat, a reminder of a day doing water sports. Clare had flipped from the raft and when she successfully swam back to it, Aiden confessed his love for her. She replied, “easy-breezy.” Their friend, Scotty, had remarked that Clare had rocketed, and to freeze that memory, he gives her a rocket-shaped key ring with the words written on the back.

The never-ending gestures of love gradually overwhelm Clare and she begins to doubt herself. At the spot where they'd celebrated Valentine's Day, struggling to get through the day, she texts Stella to join them. When Aiden reappears in a tux, he sees Stella has joined what was supposed to be their perfect date. Now turned into a friendly dinner with Stella and Scotty, when Scotty mentions he did not tag the school wall, Clare insists they break into school for him. Although Clare hopes no one realizes her intention, Aiden asks Stella to drop the act as he knows Clare is trying to divert their romantic date.

Clare tells Scotty she had hoped for a clean break with Aiden, but he sees it difficult. She believes his going to his dream college, Berklee, would have made it easier for him, as she is looking forward to college life. The burglar alarm goes off, and Aiden injures his hand in their escape. At the hospital, his mother takes care of him. Clare finds out he wasn't accepted at Berklee and is furious. Confronting him for not telling her, tired of his dishonesty, she doubts if he even intended to say goodbye. They spend most of the night apart at a party.

When Aiden expresses his love for her, Clare cannot say the same. Aiden leaves heartbroken, feeling their relationship has truly ended. Clare's mother helps her realize a relationship cannot work if the end is decided before it even starts. Intending to end it with Aiden on the right note, she texts him to meet her. Confessing her love, they swim to the buoy together. Afterwards, Aiden admits he now agrees with her, even if it hurts. He defers a year to go to Los Angeles to pursue music.

Clare leaves for New Hampshire the next morning, focused on her studies, though regularly checking Aiden's social media updates. An LA musician releases a song online. Deciding to meet again during Clare's summer break, they meet at the playground, just like when they first met.

Cast
 Jordan Fisher as Aidan
 Talia Ryder as Clare
 Ayo Edebiri as Stella
 Nico Hiraga as Scotty
 Jennifer Robertson as Nancy
 Eva Day as Riley
 Julia Benson as Claudia
 Dalias Blake as Rick
 Patrick Sabongui as Steve
 Sarah Grey as Collette
 Djouliet Amara as Tess

Production
In September 2020, Talia Ryder and Jordan Fisher joined the cast of the film, with Michael Lewen set to make his directorial debut, from a screenplay by Ben York Jones and Amy Reed, based upon the novel of the same name by Jennifer E. Smith, with Fisher set to serve as an executive producer. In October 2020, Ayo Edebiri, Nico Hiraga, Jennifer Robertson, Patrick Sabongui, Eva Day, Julia Benson, Dalias Blake, Sarah Grey and Djouliet Amara joined the cast of the film. Principal photography began in October 2020.

Reception
 On Metacritic, the film has a weighted average score of 54 out of 100 based on 9 critics, indicating "mixed or average reviews".

References

External links
 
 

2022 films
2022 directorial debut films
2022 romantic drama films
2020s English-language films
2020s teen drama films
2020s teen romance films
American romantic drama films
American teen drama films
American teen romance films
English-language Netflix original films
Films based on American novels
Films based on romance novels
Films based on young adult literature
Lionsgate films
2020s American films